Big E may refer to:

 Capital letter "E"

People
 Big E (wrestler) (born 1986), American professional wrestler, born Ettore Ewen, formerly known as "Big E Langston"
 Elvin Hayes (born 1945; nicknamed "Big E"), American basketball player and radio analyst
 Eric Lindros (born 1973; nicknamed "Big E"), Canadian ice hockey player

Ships
  (nicknamed "Big E"), the sixth aircraft carrier of the United States Navy
  (nicknamed "Big E"), the world's first nuclear-powered aircraft carrier

Other uses
 Eyjafjallajökull, the ice cap covering the stratovolcano known as "Big E"
 The Big E, the only cross-state agricultural fair in the United States, held annually in West Springfield, Massachusetts
 The Big E Coliseum, a 5,900-seat multi-purpose arena on the grounds of The Big E
 Eldora Speedway, nicknamed "The Big E", a dirt motorsports track near New Weston, Ohio
 Big E (supermarket). supermarket chain in Indianapolis, Indiana

See also

 Biggie (disambiguation)
 Biggy (disambiguation)
 Big (disambiguation)
 E (disambiguation)